Qaleh-ye Now-e Fashapuyeh (also Romanized as Qal‘eh-ye Now-e Fashāpūyeh) is a village in Hasanabad Rural District, Fashapuyeh District, Ray County, Tehran Province, Iran. At the 2006 census, its population was 386, in 94 families.

References 

Populated places in Ray County, Iran